Legionella santicrucis is a Gram-negative bacterium from the genus Legionella, which was isolated from tap water in  St. Croix on the Virgin Islands.

References

External links
Type strain of Legionella santicrucis at BacDive -  the Bacterial Diversity Metadatabase

Legionellales
Bacteria described in 1985